Alburnus Maior is a non-governmental organization based in Roşia Montană, Romania. It opposes the proposed gold mining project of Gabriel Resources.

References

External links
 Official website
 NGOWatch: Alburnus Maior
 MiningWatch Canada: Alburnus Maior

Political advocacy groups in Romania
Alba County
Nature conservation organisations based in Europe